Yarych Confectionery Ltd is a manufacturer of semi-sweet biscuits and crackers in  Staryi Yarychiv,
Lviv Raion, Lviv Oblast, Ukraine.

Semi-sweet biscuit is a biscuit with a small content of sugar and fat, bright color and puff surface structure.

Cracker is a snack with a porous structure. They can be used as a basis for a variety of canapés or desserts.

The company has adopted the IFS Food system of quality.

History 
The factory was founded in 1986. It was a bakery that specialized in bakery products.

In 2000, it was bought by the international giant Nestle, together with the Lviv factory Svitoch. In 2008, Yarich was sold to Lviv businessmen Volodymyr Hnatiuk and Oleg Klimchuk.

In October 2014, Poland started supplying private label products for the Carrefour network. "Petit Beurre" cookies are new both for the factory and for the Ukrainian market, but are one of the most popular types in the segment of simple cookies in Europe. Confectioners have developed these sweets specifically for entering the European market. In 2016, the Deposit Guarantee Fund reported that Yarich owed UAH 75 million on loans from the bankrupt Forum Bank, and that its production facilities, trademarks and corporate rights were pledged.

On October 3, 2018, the Antimonopoly Committee of Ukraine allowed Horizon Capital to acquire the factory.

External links
Official website

References 

Bakeries of Ukraine
Confectionery companies of Ukraine
Manufacturing companies of Ukraine
Lviv Oblast